The Bureau of Overseas Buildings Operations (OBO) is a US Government agency that directs the worldwide overseas building program for the United States Department of State and the U.S. Government community serving abroad .

OBO helps set worldwide priorities for the design, construction, acquisition, maintenance, use, and sale of real properties and the use of sales proceeds.

As of October 25, 2021, the Bureau's director is Ambassador William Moser.

Bureau of Overseas Buildings Operations Overview

The mission of the Bureau of Overseas Building Operations (OBO) is to assure that over 291 U.S. diplomatic missions around the world have secure and functional facilities to allow over 24,000 employees overseas to achieve the U.S. foreign policy objectives. In order to accomplish this, OBO serves as the U.S. Department of State Overseas Property Manager. The mission simply stated requires- to provide safe, secure, functional, and resilient facilities that represent the U.S. government to the host nation and support the department's achievement of U.S. foreign policy objectives abroad. These facilities represent American values and the best in American architecture, design, engineering, technology, sustainability, art, culture, and construction execution.

The Foreign Service Act of 1926 granted the Secretary of State the authority to acquire by purchase, construction, or exchange sites and buildings in foreign capitals and other foreign cities; to maintain, repair, improve, and refurbish these properties; and to dispose of properties that become surplus, underutilized, or uneconomical. This authority is delegated to OBO, which acts as the Single Real Property Manager (SRPM) for non-military U.S. Government property overseas. The act also grants the Secretary of State the authority to provide residential and office space, and necessary related facilities, to other agencies overseas whose employees are under the authority of the Chief of Mission. Until 2001, OBO was known as the Foreign Buildings Office (FBO). OBO falls under the direction of the Undersecretary for Management (M).

The Office of Policy and Program Analysis (OBO/RM/P)

This office is responsible for managing the bureau's overall engagements with Congress, the Office of the Inspector General (OIG), and the Government Accountability Office (GAO) and is the central focal point for conveying oversight and accountability information to these external entities. RM/P is also responsible for managing the bureau's strategic planning development, implementation, monitoring, and evaluation processes and products such as the Functional Bureau Strategy (FBS), Bureau Resource Request (BRR) submission, Annual Performance Plan/Annual Performance Review, among others. The office coordinates the development of OBO policy directives and revisions to the Foreign Affairs Manual and Foreign Affairs Handbooks (FAM/FAH) and internal Policy and Standard Operating Procedures Directives, and provides policy development assistance to all OBO Offices. Lastly, RM/P manages all responses to OIG Hotline Complaints, FOIA requests, and Congressional inquiries.

The Office of Planning and Real Estate (OBO/PRE)

PRE is a directorate in the Bureau of Overseas Buildings Operations (OBO) that oversees and implements the Department of State's programs related to buildings and real estate. PRE manages a portfolio of more 3,000 functional properties and over 16,000 residential properties at over 291 U.S. diplomatic posts abroad which is supported by the expertise through its four offices.

Office of Master Planning and Evaluations (OBO/PRE/MPE) supports OBO programs and projects with a wide range of planning and evaluation services through their two divisions, Master Planning (MPD) and Evaluations (EV). The Master Planning Division establishes the planning framework for short-term and future facilities development at U.S. diplomatic missions, focusing on master plans, country plans, alternative analyses, advance plans and site acquisition plans. The Evaluations Division conducts a wide variety of financial analyses including purchase and sales appraisals, market rent analyses, market surveys, and feasibility studies. Together, the Divisions inform near- and long-term decisions necessary for optimal management of the OBO real estate portfolio.

Office of Acquisitions and Disposals (OBO/PRE/OAD) manages the purchase and sale of land, diplomatic facilities, residential properties and other real estate across OBO's global portfolio through its two divisions, Site Acquisitions (SA) and Asset Management (AM). The Site Acquisitions Division is responsible for acquiring land in support of the Capital Security Construction Program – a Congressionally appropriated program that funds site acquisitions, detailed planning, design, and construction of new U.S. Embassies and Consulates worldwide. Site Acquisition Realty Specialists lead teams of stakeholders in OBO, Post, and Diplomatic Security to identify and acquire the best possible locations for future diplomatic facilities that include factors such as security, representational quality, proximity to government ministries and to staff housing, infrastructure and local amenities. Site Acquisitions also provides acquisition support on ancillary sites for existing facility improvements/expansion. The Asset Management Division identifies and acquires all properties, with the exception of sites for New Embassies or Consulates. This includes staff housing, representational housing, Marine Security Guard Residences, warehouses, and office buildings. Asset Management also manages the decommissioning and disposal of owned facilities. The Office of Acquisitions and Disposals also supports planning efforts and portfolio reviews conducted by other offices in the Planning and Real Estate Directorate.

Office of Strategic Planning (OBO/PRE/OSP) manages OBO's overall strategic planning process, providing short- and long-range planning, prioritization, and real property requirements in collaboration with bureaus and federal agencies in support of the Department of State's diplomatic mission. The office develops the Top 80 List of most vulnerable posts and manages the major program schedules for Capital Security Construction and the Major Rehabilitation Programs. Additionally, it manages the department's real property system of record, as well as the tools, data, and processes to link real property records to active transactions, and providing collaborative access to real property information.

Office of Real Property Leasing (OBO/PRE/RPL) is the central overseas leasing office for the Department of State (DOS) through its two divisions, Major Leasing (ML) and Portfolio (PM) Management. Accomplishment of its mission requires collaboration across virtually all of OBO. RPL's mission is to responsibly manage the department's global portfolio of well over 16,000 leased properties for all overseas agencies, with annual lease costs over five hundred million dollars. RPL is responsible for establishing housing policies and procedures to accountably manage the residential portfolio.

References

External links
 Official Website

OBO